is an interchange passenger railway station located in Wakaba-ku, Chiba, Japan, operated by East Japan Railway Company (JR East) and the Chiba Urban Monorail.

Lines
Tsuga Station is served by the Sōbu Main Line and is 43.4 kilometers from the western terminus of the line  at Tokyo Station. It is also served by the Chiba Urban Monorail Line 2  and 7.7 kilometers from the terminus of that line at Chiba Station.

Station layout

JR East
JR Tsuga Station has a single island platform with an elevated station  building located above the tracks and platform. The station is staffed.

Chiba Monorail
The Chiba Urban Monorail Tsuga Station is an elevated station with two opposed side platforms.

History
After World War II, the JGR became the Japanese National Railways (JNR). Tsuga became full passenger station on March 28, 1968. The station was absorbed into the JR East network upon the privatization of JNR on April 1, 1987. The Chiba Urban Monorail began operations to the station from March 28, 2001. A new elevated station building was completed between 2002-2009.

Passenger statistics
In fiscal 2019, the JR portion of the station was used by an average of 21,084 passengers daily In fiscal 2018, the China Urban Monorail portion of the station was served by 6,041 passengers.

Surrounding area
 Chiba City Wakaba Ward Office
 Tsuga Community Center
 Wakaba Health and Welfare Center

See also
 List of railway stations in Japan

References

External links

 JR East station information 
Chiba Urban Monorail station information

Railway stations in Chiba Prefecture
Railway stations in Japan opened in 1968
Sōbu Main Line
Railway stations in Chiba (city)